Family Pack is a 2022 Indian Kannada language comedy film directed by Arjun Kumar S., who previously directed Sankashta Kara Ganapathi. The film stars Likith Shetty, Amrutha Iyengar,  Rangayana Raghu, and Achyuth Kumar. The film follows two families and a human-like ghost played by Rangayana Raghu. The film premiered on Amazon Prime Video.

Plot synopsis
Abhi encounters a ghost when he had lost hope to live. The ghost helps him by granting him a new life. But things get complicated when the ghost realizes that their lives and destinies intervene on a deeper level.

Cast 

Likith Shetty as Abhi
Amrutha Iyengar as Bhoomika aka Baby Boo
Rangayana Raghu as Manjunath/Manjanna
Achyuth Kumar as Abhi's father
Padmaja Rao as Abhi's mother
Sihi Kahi Chandru
Sadhu Kokila as Krishna
Dattanna
Tilak
Shivaram
Sharmitha Gowda
 Chandu Gowda
 Jahangir
Nagabhushan
Raghu Ramanakoppa
Sujay Shastri
 Mahantesh Hiremath
Shruthi Ramesh
Santosh Shetty
 Nischitha Shetty

Production
After the success of Sunkastha Kara Ganapathi, director Arjun Kumar and actor Likith Shetty reunited for this project. Although they struggled to find producers at first, Puneeth Rajkumar and his wife Ashwini later decided to produce the film under their banner PRK Productions. Shooting began in September 2020, and it finished in July 2021.

Soundtrack
The song "Biddalappo" was composed by Gurukiran, sung by Chintan Vikas and was written by V. Manohar. The song "Bekagide" was composed, written, and sung by Viraj Kannadiga.

Reception
A. Sharadhaa of The New Indian Express opined that "Family Pack is a comfort watch with a message". Jagadish Angadi of Deccan Herald wrote that "'Family Pack' has shortcomings but the film's twist and turns are placed well. The eventful second half makes up for the snail-paced first half. The film could have worked towards being an endearing tale of human emotions". Sowmya Rajendran of The News Minute stated that "At under two hours, Family Pack feels like an endurance test that most are likely to fail unless they're film critics with rhino hides who've been subjected to one too many bad films in their lifetime". Sunayana Suresh of The Times of India said that "Family Pack is one of those films that is unapologetic when it comes to its comedy. And this is its biggest strength. Director Arjun Kumar delivers yet another funny film".

References

External links
 

2022 films
2022 comedy films
Indian comedy films
2020s Kannada-language films